Tatsinsky (masculine), Tatsinskaya (feminine), or Tatsinskoye (neuter) may refer to:
Tatsinsky District, a district of Rostov Oblast, Russia
Tatsinskaya Airfield, the airfield used by the German Wehrmacht during the Battle of Stalingrad
Tatsinskaya (rural locality), a rural locality (a stanitsa) in Rostov Oblast, Russia